The Drinks Business is a monthly international B2B magazine and website published by Union Press. The magazine discusses the latest news and trends in the global beer, wine and spirits industries.

History and profile
thedrinksbusiness.com was launched in 2002. It has an international audience of 685,000 monthly readers  and regularly provides content for publications such as The Huffington Post and Time Magazine.

db Awards
The db Awards is an annual drinks industry event, held at the London International Wine Fair  in Olympia. Winners in 2013 included Beefeater Gin, Cote du Rhone, Roberson Wine  and Dubai Duty Free.

Green Awards
The Drinks Business Green Awards is the world's largest programme to raise awareness of green issues in the drinks trade. Winners in 2013 included Sainsbury's, John E Fells  and Wetherspoons.

References

External links
 

Business magazines published in the United Kingdom
Monthly magazines published in the United Kingdom
Food and drink magazines
Magazines established in 2001
Wine magazines